The Moreton Bay Tramroad Company was a private enterprise attempt to establish railways in the new colony of Queensland. It was stillborn.

People 

 Coote,
 Stephens,
 Buckley.

 Abraham Fitzgibbon engineer, who was assistant to William Doyne on the Dun Mountain Tramway in Nelson, New Zealand.

Land Grant Railway 

It had been proposed to fund it as a Land Grant Railway.

Horse power 

The tramway was intended to be operated by horses.

Characteristics

Gradients 

The later railway along the route of the tramway has ruling gradients of 1 in 50. This might be rather steep for horse operation, unless unloaded in uphill direction.

Rails 

The line was originally to use  rail.

Nomenclature 

The Tramway company is sometimes called a Tramroad.

Timeline

1859 

 Queensland separated from New South Wales on 6 June 1859. Some very preliminary railway plans had been prepared by the New South Wales Government which were handed over to the new Queensland Government.

1860 
 April – An early mention in a political platform of the need for railways or tramways in Queensland.
 April – An early mention of the constructing firm of Moreton, Peto and Brassey.
 November – An advertisement for the company's prospectus in a Sydney newspaper.
 November – An advertisement for the company's prospectus in a Brisbane paper.

1861

1862 

 April – coal deposits reported next to the proposed route.
 29 May – Tramway assets taken over by Government.

1863 

 Insolvent Court
 9 May – the Government Railways Bill repeals the Tramway Act, except for court actions already in action.
 20 August – Railway Bill in parliament

1865 

 29 March 1865 – three large shareholder taken to Supreme Court for not paying calls on contributing shares.
The three are:
 Coote,
 Stephens,
 Buckley.

References 

Rail transport in Queensland